Joseph Kerr (1765August 22, 1837) was a Democratic-Republican politician from Ohio who served in the United States Senate.

Biography
Kerr (pronounced "car") was born in Kerrtown, Pennsylvania (now Chambersburg), and moved to Ohio in 1792. 
He served in a number of positions as clerk, surveyor, judge and justice of the peace in the Northwest Territory.

He served as justice of the peace at Manchester, Adams County, Ohio in 1797. and as a judge of the first quarter session court of Adams County, Northwest Territory, in 1797.

Kerr's son, Joseph Kerr Jr., died in the Battle of the Alamo.

Career
After statehood was declared, Kerr was elected to the Ohio House of Representatives in 1808, 1816, 1818, and 1819. He was elected to the Ohio State Senate in 1804 and 1810. He also served as a brigadier general of Ohio Volunteers during the War of 1812, in charge of supplying provisions to the Army of the Northwest.

Kerr was elected to the U.S. Senate in 1814 to fill a vacancy created by the resignation of Thomas Worthington. Kerr served from December 10, 1814, to March 3, 1815, and did not seek re-election.

Death
Kerr's extensive farm went bankrupt in 1826, and he moved to Memphis, Tennessee and then to rural Louisiana, where he purchased a homestead near Lake Providence.  He died on August 22, 1837, and was interred in the Kerr Family Burying Ground in Lake Providence.

References

External links

1765 births
1837 deaths
Members of the Ohio House of Representatives
Northwest Territory judges
Ohio state senators
American militia generals
American militiamen in the War of 1812
United States senators from Ohio
Ohio Democratic-Republicans
Democratic-Republican Party United States senators
People from Chambersburg, Pennsylvania
People from Lake Providence, Louisiana
Military personnel from Pennsylvania